The 2018 United States House of Representatives elections in Florida were held on Tuesday, November 6, 2018, to elect the 27 U.S. representatives from the state of Florida, one from each of the state's 27 congressional districts. The elections coincided with the elections of other offices, including a gubernatorial election, other elections to the House of Representatives, elections to the United States Senate, and various state and local elections. The party primaries were held on August 28, 2018.

The state congressional delegation changed from a 16–11 Republican majority to a slim 14–13 Republican majority, one short from a Democratic flip. These were seen as the most seats Democrats had attained in Florida since 1982. As noted in the vote table below, Florida does not count votes in uncontested races, so the votes in the four uncontested seats held by Democratic members of the House are not counted in the totals or percentages on this page, and each under counts the votes for Democrats in Florida.

Results summary

Statewide

District
Results of the 2018 United States House of Representatives elections in Florida by district:

District 1

The 1st district stretches along the Emerald Coast and is located in the western Panhandle anchored by Pensacola, it also includes Fort Walton Beach,

Navarre, and Wright. Republican Matt Gaetz, who has represented the district since 2017, was elected with 69% of the vote in 2016.

Democratic primary

Candidates
Declared
The following person(s) declared:
 Phil Ehr, U.S. Navy commande; and
 Jennifer M. Zimmerman, pediatrician.

Primary results

Republican primary

Candidates
Declared
The following person(s) declared:
 Cris Dosev, businessman;
 Matt Gaetz, incumbent; and
 John Mills, retired U.S. Navy pilot.

Primary results

General election

Results

District 2

The 2nd district is located in the Big Bend region and is anchored by Panama City, and includes the suburbs of Tallahassee. Republican Neal Dunn, who has represented the district since 2017, was elected with 67% of the vote in 2016.

Democratic primary

Candidates
Declared
The following person(s) declared:
 Brandon Peters, lawyer
 Bob Rackleff, former Leon County Commissioner.

Polling

Primary results

Republican primary

Candidates
The following person(s) declared:
 Neal Dunn, incumbent

General election

Results

District 3

The 3rd district is located in North Central Florida and includes the cities of Gainesville, Palatka, and Ocala. Republican Ted Yoho, who has represented

the district since 2013, was re-elected to a third term with 57% of the vote in 2016.

Democratic primary

Candidates

Declared
The following person(s) declared:
 Dushyant Gosai, educator
 Yvonne Hayes Hinson, former Gainesville City Commissioner
 Tom Wells, businessman

Primary results

Republican primary

Candidates

Declared
The following person(s) declared:
 Judson Sapp, businessman
 Ted Yoho, incumbent

Primary results

General election

Results

District 4

The 4th district is located in the First Coast region and is made up of the Jacksonville metropolitan area including Jacksonville Beach and St. Augustine. Republican John Rutherford, who has represented the district since 2017, was elected with 70% of the vote in 2016.

Democratic primary

Candidates

Declared
The following person(s) declared:
 Ges Selmont, attorney

Republican primary

Candidates

Declared
The following person(s) declared:
 John Rutherford, incumbent

General election

Results

District 5

The 5th district stretches along the northern border of Florida from the state capital, Tallahassee, to Jacksonville. Democrat Al Lawson, who has represented the district since 2017, was elected with 64% of the vote in 2016.  Lawson ran for re-election.

Democratic primary

Candidates

Declared
The following person(s) declared:
 Alvin Brown, former Jacksonville mayor
 Al Lawson, incumbent

Polling

Primary results

Republican primary

Candidates

Declared
The following person(s) declared:
 Virginia Fuller, nurse and perennial candidate

General election

Results

District 6

The 6th district is located in the Surf Coast region and includes the cities of Daytona Beach, Deltona, and Palm Coast. Republican Ron DeSantis, who has represented the district since 2013, was re-elected to a third term with 59% of the vote in 2016. He did not run for re-election in 2018, rather opting to run for Governor of Florida.  Florida's 6th district is one of the 20 Republican held seats included in the second round of seats targeted by the Democratic Congressional Campaign Committee in 2018.

Democratic primary

Candidates
Declared
The following person(s) declared:
 Stephen Sevigny, radiologist
 Nancy Soderberg, former Representative at the United Nations and former Deputy National Security Advisor.
 John Upchurch, attorney

Polling

Primary results

Republican primary

Candidates
Declared
The following person(s) declared:
 Fred Costello, former state representative
 Michael Waltz, former Green Beret
 John Ward, businessman

Polling

Primary results

General election

Endorsements

Polling

Results

District 7

The 7th district is centered around downtown Orlando and the northern Orlando suburbs such as Sanford and Winter Park. Democrat Stephanie Murphy, who has represented the district since 2017, was elected with 51% of the vote in 2016.

Democratic primary

Candidates
The following person(s) declared:
 Chardo Richardson, former president of the ACLU
 Stephanie Murphy, incumbent

Endorsements

Primary results

Republican primary

Candidates
Declared
The following person(s) declared:
 Mike Miller, state representative
 Scott Sturgill,  former Seminole County Soil & Water Conservation District Supervisor and state house candidate in 2014
 Vennia Francois, policy advisor

Declined
The following person(s) declined to declare:
 Bob Cortes, state representative
 Joel Greenberg, Seminole County Tax Collector
 David Simmons, state senator

Endorsements

Polling

Primary results

General election

Polling

Results

District 8

The 8th district includes the Space Coast region and the cities of Melbourne, Palm Bay, and Vero Beach. Republican Bill Posey, who has represented the district since 2013 and previously represented the 15th district from 2009 to 2013, was re-elected to a fifth term with 63% of the vote in 2016.

Democratic primary

Candidates

Declared
The following person(s) declared:
 Sanjay Patel, management consultant

Republican primary

Candidates

Declared
The following person(s) declared:
 Bill Posey, incumbent

General election

Results

-

District 9

The 9th district is located in inland Central Florida including Kissimmee, St. Cloud, and Winter Haven. Democrat Darren Soto, who has represented the district since 2017, was elected with 57% of the vote in 2016.

Democratic primary

Candidates

Declared
The following person(s) declared:
 Alan Grayson, former U.S. Representative
 Darren Soto, incumbent

Polling

Primary results

Republican primary

Candidates

Declared
The following person(s) declared:
 Wayne Liebnitzky, engineer and candidate for Congress in 2016

General election

Polling

Results

District 10

The 10th district is centered around Orlando and the surrounding suburbs such as Lockhart, Oak Ridge, and Zellwood. Democrat Val Demings, who has represented the district since 2017, was elected with 65% of the vote in 2016. Because no write-in candidates or candidates of other parties filed to run in this district, the Democratic primary was open to all voters.

Democratic primary

Candidates

Declared
The following person(s) declared:
 Wade Darius, businessman
 Val Demings, incumbent

Primary results

General election
Incumbent Val Demings ran unopposed in the general election. As such, no election for the position was held, and Mrs. Demings was declared the winner automatically by the Board of Elections for the State of Florida.

District 11

The 11th district is located in Central Florida and includes the southern suburbs of Ocala and Spring Hill, this district also includes the retirement community known as The Villages. Republican Daniel Webster, who has represented the district since 2017 and previously represented the 8th district from 2011 to 2013 and the 10th district from 2013 to 2017, was re-elected to a fourth term with 65% of the vote in 2016.

Democratic primary

Candidates

Declared
The following person(s) declared:
 Dana Cottrell, teacher

Republican primary

Candidates

Declared
The following person(s) declared:
 Daniel Webster, incumbent

General election

Results

District 12

The 12th district is located in the Tampa Bay Area and includes Dade City, New Port Richey, and Palm Harbor. Republican Gus Bilirakis, who has represented the district since 2013 and previously represented the 9th district from 2007 to 2013, was re-elected to a sixth term with 69% of the vote in 2016.

Democratic primary

Candidates

Declared
The following person(s) declared:
 Chris Hunter, former federal prosecutor
 Stephen Perenich, tax preparer
 Robert Tager, attorney and candidate for Congress in 2016

Primary results

Republican primary

Candidates

Declared
The following person(s) declared:
 Gus Bilirakis, incumbent

General election

Polling

Results

District 13

The 13th district is located in the Tampa Bay Area and includes Clearwater, Largo and Saint Petersburg. Democrat Charlie Crist, who has represented the district since 2017, was elected with 52% of the vote in 2016.

Democratic primary

Candidates

Declared
The following person(s) declared:
 Charlie Crist, incumbent

Republican primary

Candidates

Declared
The following person(s) declared:
 George Buck, educator
 Brad Sostack, navy veteran

Primary results

General election

Results

District 14

The 14th district is centered around the city of Tampa and the immediate surrounding suburbs such as Lutz and Temple Terrace. Democrat Kathy Castor, who has represented the district since 2013 and previously represented the 11th district from 2007 to 2013, was re-elected to a sixth term with 62% of the vote in 2016. Castor was the only candidate in 2018, and so was unopposed in the Democratic primary and general election.

Democratic primary

Candidates

Declared
The following person(s) declared:
 Kathy Castor, incumbent

General election
Incumbent Kathy Castor ran unopposed in the general election. As such, no election for the position was held, and Mrs. Castor was declared the winner automatically by the Board of Elections for the State of Florida.

District 15

The 15th district is located in inland Central Florida and is anchored by Lakeland. The district also includes the eastern suburbs of Tampa such as Brandon and Riverview. Republican Dennis Ross, who has represented the district since 2013 and previously represented the 12th district from 2011 to 2013, was retiring.

Republican primary

Candidates

Nominee
The following person(s) were nominated:
 Ross Spano, State Representative (District 59) since 2012

Eliminated in primary
The following person(s) were eliminated within the Republican Party's primary:
 Neil Combee, State Representative (District 39) 2012–2017
 Sean Harper, contractor
 Danny Kushmer, non-profit executive
 Ed Shoemaker, conservative activist

Declined
The following person(s) declined to declare:
 Ben Albritton, State Representative (District 56) since 2010
 Scott Franklin, Lakeland City Commissioner since 2018
 Grady Judd, Sheriff of Polk County since 2005
 Tom Lee, State Senator (District 20) 1996–2006 and since 2012
 Seth McKeel, State Representative (District 40) 2006–2014
 Kelli Stargel, State Senator (District 22) since 2012

Withdrew
The following person(s) withdrew from the election:
 Loretta "Leah Lax" Miller, former IDF officer
 Curt Rogers
 Dennis Ross, incumbent U.S. Representative since 2011

Endorsements

Polling

Primary results

Democratic primary

Candidates

Declared
The following person(s) declared:
 Kristen Carlson, attorney
 Andrew Learned, naval reserve officer
 Ray Pena, retired police officer

Polling

Primary results

General election

Endorsements

Fundraising

Polling

Results

District 16

The 16th district is located in the Suncoast region and includes Bradenton, Sarasota, and some Tampa suburbs such as FishHawk. Republican Vern Buchanan, who has represented the district since 2013 and previously represented the 13th district from 2007 to 2013, was re-elected to a sixth term with 60% of the vote in 2016.

Democratic primary
Florida's 16th district is one of the 20 Republican held seats included in the second round of seats targeted by the Democratic Congressional Campaign Committee in 2018.

Candidates

Declared
The following person(s) declared:
 Jan Schneider, attorney
 David Shapiro, attorney

Primary results

Republican primary

Candidates

Declared
The following person(s) declared:
 Vern Buchanan, incumbent

General election

Polling

Results

District 17

The 17th district comprises most of the Florida Heartland, including the cities of Sebring and Okeechobee, as well as parts of the Suncoast, such as North Port and Port Charlotte. Republican Tom Rooney, who has represented the district since 2013 and previously represented the 16th district from 2009 to 2013, was re-elected to a fifth term with 62% of the vote in 2016. Rooney announced on February 19, 2018, that he will retire from Congress and not seek re-election in 2018. The Democratic Party candidate April Freeman died on September 24, 2018, six weeks before the election. Allen Ellison was chosen to be the Democratic nominee.

Democratic primary

Candidates

Declared
The following person(s) declared:
 April Freeman, businesswoman and candidate for Congress in 2014 and 2016 (deceased) 
 Bill Pollard, respiratory therapist

Primary results

Republican primary

Candidates

Declared
The following person(s) declared:
 Bill Akins, veteran
 Greg Steube , state senator
 Julio Gonzalez, state representative

Endorsements

Polling

Primary results

General election

Results

District 18

The 18th district is located in the Treasure Coast region and includes Stuart, Port St. Lucie, and the northern Palm Beach suburbs such as Jupiter and Palm Beach Gardens. Republican Brian Mast, who has represented the district since 2017, was elected with 54% of the vote in 2016.

Democratic primary
Florida's 18th district was included on the initial list of Republican held seats being targeted by the Democratic Congressional Campaign Committee in 2018.

Candidates

Declared
The following person(s) declared:
 Lauren Baer, attorney and former U.S. State Department official
 Pam Keith, attorney and candidate for U.S. Senate in 2016

Declined
The following person(s) declined to declare:
 Dave Aronberg, Palm Beach County State Attorney and former state senator
 Jonathan Chane, attorney and candidate for Congress in 2016
 Corinna Robinson, retired Army major and candidate for Congress in 2014

Primary results

Republican primary

Candidates

Declared
The following person(s) declared:
 Dave Cummings, educator
 Mark Freeman, businessman
 Brian Mast, incumbent

Primary results

General election

Debates
 Complete video of debate, October 15, 2018

Polling

Results

District 19

The 19th district is located in Southwestern Florida and includes Bonita Springs, Cape Coral, and Naples. Republican Francis Rooney, who has represented the district since 2017, was elected with 66% of the vote in 2016.

Democratic primary

Candidates

Declared
The following person(s) declared:
 David Holden, financial adviser
 Todd James Truax, healthcare administrator

Primary results

Republican primary

Candidates

Declared
The following person(s) declared:
 Francis Rooney, incumbent

General election

Polling

Results

District 20

The 20th district stretches from inland South Florida with many protected areas of the Everglades and Belle Glade to the Miami metro area and includes parts of West Palm Beach & Fort Lauderdale, and Miramar. Democrat Alcee Hastings, who has represented the district since 2013 and previously represented the 23rd district from 1993 to 2013, was re-elected to a thirteenth term with 80% of the vote in 2016.

Democratic primary

Candidates

Declared
The following person(s) declared:
 Alcee Hastings, incumbent
 Sheila Cherfilus-McCormick, Healthcare Executive

Primary results

General election

Results

District 21

The 21st district is located in the Miami metro area and includes the West Palm Beach suburbs, such as Greenacres and Wellington, as well as Boynton Beach and Delray Beach. Democrat Lois Frankel, who has represented the district since 2017 and previously represented the 22nd district from 2013 to 2017, was re-elected to a third term with 63% of the vote in 2016.

Democratic primary

Candidates

Declared
The following person(s) declared:
 Lois Frankel, incumbent

General election
Incumbent Lois Frankel ran unopposed in the general election. As such, no election for the position was held, and Mrs. Demings was declared the winner automatically by the Board of Elections for the State of Florida.

District 22

The 22nd district is located in the Miami metro area and includes Boca Raton and Parkland, the site of the Stoneman Douglas High School shooting. Also, this district includes significant portions of Fort Lauderdale and Pompano Beach. Democrat Ted Deutch, who has represented the district since 2017 and previously represented the 19th district from 2010 to 2013 and the 21st district from 2013 to 2017, was re-elected to a fourth term with 59% of the vote in 2016.

Democratic primary

Candidates

Declared
The following person(s) declared:
 Ted Deutch, incumbent
 Jeff Fandl, businessman

Primary results

Republican primary

Candidates

Declared
The following person(s) declared:
 Nicolas Kimaz, businessman
 Javier Manjarres, blogger
 Eddison Walters, real estate investor

Primary results

General election

Results

District 23

The 23rd district is located in the Miami metro area, including Plantation, Sunrise, and Weston. Democrat Debbie Wasserman Schultz, who has represented the district since 2013 and previously represented the 20th district from 2005 to 2013, was re-elected to a seventh term with 57% of the vote in 2016.

Democratic primary

Candidates

Declared
The following person(s) declared:
 Debbie Wasserman Schultz, incumbent

Republican primary

Candidates

Declared
The following person(s) declared:
 Joe Kaufman, counter-terrorism researcher and candidate for state house in 1998 and 2000 and Congress in 2012, 2014, and 2016
 Carlos Reyes, lawyer
 Carla Spalding, nurse and candidate for Congress in 2016

Endorsements

Primary results

Independents
Tim Canova, who lost in the 2016 primary to Wasserman Schultz by a 57% to 43% margin, ran as an independent in the 2018 general election. Don Endriss also ran as an independent candidate.

General election

Results

District 24

The 24th district includes parts of Miami and its northern suburbs such as North Miami Beach and Miami Gardens. Democrat Frederica Wilson, who has represented the district since 2013 and previously represented the 17th district from 2011 to 2013, was re-elected to a fourth term unopposed in 2016. Because no write-in candidates or candidates of other parties filed to run in this district, the Democratic primary was open to all voters.

Democratic primary

Candidates

Declared
The following person(s) declared:
 Ricardo de la Fuente, entrepreneur
 Frederica Wilson, incumbent

Primary results

Republican primary 
Withdrew

The following person(s) withdrew from the election:
 Louis E. Sola, U.S. Army veteran

General election
Both candidates were removed from the ballot which was cited for the recount in the Florida gubernatorial and United States Senate elections.  Incumbent Frederica Wilson won unopposed in the general election.

District 25

The 25th district includes the western Miami suburbs, such as Hialeah and Miami Lakes, and goes across the northern border of the Everglades to eastern Naples suburbs of Golden Gate and Immokalee. The district also extends upward into the Florida Heartland including Clewiston and LaBelle. Republican Mario Díaz-Balart, who has represented the district since 2013 and previously represented the 21st district from 2011 to 2013 as well as a different version of the 25th from 2003 to 2011, was re-elected to an eighth term with 62% of the vote in 2016.

Democratic primary
Florida's 25th district has been included on the initial list of Republican-held seats being targeted by the Democratic Congressional Campaign Committee in 2018.

Candidates 
Declared

The following person(s) declared:
 Mary Barzee Flores, attorney and former Eleventh Judicial Circuit Court of Florida Judge

Withdrew

The following person(s) withdrew:
 Annisa Karim, Lee County Department of Parks & Recreation manager (endorsed Flores)
 Alina Valdes, doctor and candidate for Congress in 2016 (endorsed Flores)

Endorsements

Republican primary

Candidates

Declared
The following person(s) declared:
 Mario Díaz-Balart, incumbent

General election

Polling

Results

District 26

The 26th district is centered on the Miami suburb of Homestead, includes most of the Everglades National Park, and extends downward into the Florida Keys, including Key West and Marathon. Republican Carlos Curbelo, who has represented the district since 2015, was re-elected to a second term with 53% of the vote in 2016.

Democratic primary
Florida's 26th district was included on the initial list of Republican-held seats being targeted by the Democratic Congressional Campaign Committee in 2018.

Candidates
Declared
The following person(s) declared:
 Demetries Grimes,U.S. Navy veteran
 Debbie Mucarsel-Powell, businesswoman and candidate for state senate in 2016

Declined
The following person(s) declined to declare:
 Steve Smith, businessman

Primary results

Republican primary

Candidates

Declared
The following person(s) declared:
 Carlos Curbelo, incumbent
 Souraya Faas, television personality

Endorsements

Primary results

General election

Polling

Results

District 27

The 27th district is located in the Miami metro area, including Coral Gables, Kendall, Miami Beach, and portions of Miami. Republican Ileana Ros-Lehtinen, who has represented the district since 2013 and previously represented the 18th district from 1989 to 2013, retired from office in 2018.

Democratic primary
Florida's 27th district has been included on the initial list of Republican-held seats being targeted by the Democratic Congressional Campaign Committee in 2018.

Candidates
Declared
The following person(s) declared:
 Matt Haggman, Miami program director of the Knight Foundation and former Miami Herald reporter
 Michael Hepburn, University of Miami academic adviser and candidate for state house in 2010 and 2014
 David Richardson, state representative
 Donna Shalala, former U.S. Secretary of Health and Human Services and former president of the University of Miami
 Kristen Rosen Gonzalez, Miami Beach city commissioner

Withdrew
The following person(s) withdrew:
 Mary Barzee Flores, attorney and former Eleventh Judicial Circuit Court of Florida judge (running for FL-25)
 Scott Fuhrman, businessman and candidate for Congress in 2016
 José Javier Rodríguez, state senator
 Ken Russell, Miami City Commissioner

Potential
The following person(s) were listed as potential candidates in earlier iterations of this article, prior to the results of the 2018 United States House of Representatives Elections:
 Francisco Cerezo, attorney
 Daniella Levine Cava, Miami-Dade County Commissioner
 Cindy Lerner, former mayor of Pinecrest and former state representative
 Jimmy Morales, Miami Beach City Manager
 Mark Person
 Marc Sarnoff, former Miami City Commissioner

Declined
The following person(s) declined to declare:
 Alberto Carvalho, Miami-Dade County Public Schools Superintendent
 Manny Diaz, former mayor of Miami
 Philip Levine, Mayor of Miami Beach

Endorsements

Polling

Primary results

Republican primary

Candidates
Declared
The following person(s) declared:
 Elizabeth Adadi, U.S. Army veteran
 Bruno Barreiro, Miami-Dade County Commissioner
 Angie Chirino, songwriter (daughter of Cuban-American musician Willy Chirino)
 Stephen Marks, political consultant
 Mike Ohevzion, businessman
 Maria Peiro, educator and candidate for Congress in 2016
 Bettina Rodriguez-Aguilera, former Doral City Councilwoman
 Maria Elvira Salazar, journalist
 Gina Sosa, filmmaker

Withdrew
The following person(s) withdrew:
 Raquel Regalado, former Miami-Dade School Board member and candidate for Mayor of Miami-Dade County in 2016

Potential
The following person(s) were listed as potential candidates in earlier iterations of this article, prior to the results of the 2018 United States House of Representatives Elections:
 Jeb Bush Jr., son of former governor Jeb Bush
 José Félix Díaz, state representative
 Art Estopinan, former chief of staff to U.S. Representative Ileana Ros-Lehtinen
 Ed MacDougall, former mayor of Cutler Bay and candidate for Congress in 2014
 Jeanette Núñez, state representative
 Juan C. Zapata, former Miami-Dade County Commissioner

Declined
The following person(s) declined to declare:
 Carlos Curbelo, U.S. Representative for Florida's 26th congressional district
 Miguel Díaz de la Portilla, former state senator
 Anitere Flores, state senator
 René García, state senator
 Carlos López-Cantera, Lieutenant Governor of Florida and candidate for U.S. Senate in 2016

Endorsements

Polling

Primary results

General election

Polling

Results

See also
 2018 United States House of Representatives elections
 2018 United States elections

References

External links
 Candidates at Vote Smart
 Candidates at Ballotpedia
 Campaign finance at FEC
 Campaign finance at OpenSecrets

Official campaign websites of first district candidates
 Matt Gaetz (R) for Congress
 Jennifer Zimmerman (D) for Congress

Official campaign websites of second district candidates
 Neal Dunn (R) for Congress
 Bob Rackleff (D) for Congress

Official campaign websites of third district candidates
 Yvonne Hayes Hinson (D) for Congress
 Ted Yoho (R) for Congress

Official campaign websites of fourth district candidates
 Joceline Berrios (I) for Congress
 Jason Bulger (I) for Congress
 John Rutherford (R) for Congress
 Ges Selmont (D) for Congress

Official campaign websites of fifth district candidates
 Virginia Fuller (R) for Congress
 Al Lawson (D) for Congress

Official campaign websites of sixth district candidates
 Nancy Soderberg (D) for Congress
 Michael Waltz (R) for Congress

Official campaign websites of seventh district candidates
 Mike Miller (R) for Congress
 Stephanie Murphy (D) for Congress

Official campaign websites of eighth district candidates
 Sanjay Patel (D) for Congress
 Bill Posey (R) for Congress

Official campaign websites of ninth district candidates
 Wayne Liebnitzky (R) for Congress
 Darren Soto (D) for Congress

Official campaign websites of tenth district candidates
 Val Demings (D) for Congress

Official campaign websites of eleventh district candidates
 Dana Cottrell (D) for Congress
 Daniel Webster (R) for Congress

Official campaign websites of twelfth district candidates
 Gus Bilirakis (R) for Congress
 Chris Hunter (D) for Congress
 Angelika Purkis (I) for Congress

Official campaign websites of thirteenth district candidates
 George Buck (R) for Congress
 Charlie Crist (D) for Congress

Official campaign websites of fourteenth district candidates
 Kathy Castor (D) for Congress

Official campaign websites of fifteenth district candidates
 Kristen Carlson (D) for Congress
 Ross Spano (R) for Congress

Official campaign websites of sixteenth district candidates
 Vern Buchanan (R) for Congress
 David Shapiro (D) for Congress

Official campaign websites of seventeenth district candidates
 Allen Ellison (D) for Congress
 Greg Steube (R) for Congress

Official campaign websites of eighteenth district candidates
 Lauren Baer (D) for Congress
 Brian Mast (R) for Congress

Official campaign websites of nineteenth district candidates
 David Holden (D) for Congress
 Francis Rooney (R) for Congress

Official campaign websites of twentieth district candidates
 Alcee Hastings (D) for Congress

Official campaign websites of twenty-first district candidates
 Lois Frankel (D) for Congress

Official campaign websites of twenty-second district candidates
 Ted Deutch (D) for Congress
 Nicolas Kimaz (R) for Congress

Official campaign websites of twenty-third district candidates
 Tim Canova (I) for Congress
 Don Endriss (I) for Congress
 Joe Kaufman (R) for Congress
 Debbie Wasserman Schultz (D) for Congress

Official campaign websites of twenty-fourth district candidates
 Frederica Wilson (D) for Congress

Official campaign websites of twenty-fifth district candidates
 Mario Díaz-Balart (R) for Congress
 Mary Barzee Flores (D) for Congress

Official campaign websites of twenty-sixth district candidates
 Carlos Curbelo (R) for Congress
 Debbie Mucarsel-Powell (D) for Congress

Official campaign websites of twenty-seventh district candidates
 María Elvira Salazar (R) for Congress
 Donna Shalala (D) for Congress
References:

Florida Election Results - New York Times

Florida
2018
United States House of Representatives